Charles (German: Karl;  1 August 1713, Braunschweig – 26 March 1780, Braunschweig), Duke of Brunswick-Lüneburg (Bevern line), reigned as Prince of Brunswick-Wolfenbüttel from 1735 until his death.

Life

Charles was the eldest son of Ferdinand Albert II, Duke of Brunswick-Wolfenbüttel. He fought under Prince Eugene of Savoy against the Ottoman Empire before inheriting the Principality of Brunswick-Wolfenbüttel from his father in 1735. Through his mother he was first cousins with Empress Maria Theresa

On the suggestion of his court-preacher, Johann Friedrich Wilhelm Jerusalem, in 1745 he founded the Collegium Carolinum, an institute of higher education which is today known as the  Technical University of Brunswick. He also hired Gotthold Ephraim Lessing as the librarian for the Bibliotheca Augusta, the ducal library. Lorenz Heister of the University of Helmstedt named the botanical genus Brunsvigia in his honour, in recognition of his encouragement of botany and the study of B. orientalis.

Charles attempted to promote the economic development of his state; for example, he founded the Fürstenberg Porcelain Company, and he installed mandatory fire insurance. However, he did not manage to keep the state finances in check. As a consequence, in 1773 his eldest son Charles William Ferdinand took over government.

When the American Revolution began in 1775, Prince Charles saw an opportunity to replenish the duchy's treasury by renting its army to Great Britain. In 1776, Duke Charles signed a treaty with his cousin George III of the United Kingdom to supply troops for service with the British armies in America. 4,000 soldiers were dispatched under General Friedrich Adolf Riedesel. The Brunswick troops fought in General John Burgoyne's army at the Battles of Saratoga (1777), where they were taken prisoner as part of the Convention Army. Although the terms of surrender allowed the troops to return to Europe, the American Continental Congress cancelled the convention. The Convention Army was held prisoner in America until the war ended in 1783.

Marriage and children
In 1733, Charles married Philippine Charlotte, daughter of King Frederick William I of Prussia. They had the following children that reached adulthood:
 Charles William Ferdinand (1735–1806), father of Queen Caroline of Brunswick, wife of George IV of Great Britain.
 Sophie Caroline Mary (1737–1817), married Frederick, Margrave of Brandenburg-Bayreuth
 Anna Amalia (1739–1807), married Ernest Augustus II, Duke of Saxe-Weimar-Eisenach
 Frederick Augustus (1740–1805)
 Albert Henry (1742–1761), died childless
 William Adolf (1745–1770), died childless
 Elizabeth Christine Ulrike (1746–1840), married King Frederick William II of Prussia (divorced). She was the mother of Frederica, Duchess of York.
 Augusta Dorothea, Abbess of Gandersheim (1749–1803)
 Maximilian Jules Leopold (1752–1785), died childless

Charles also had a child out of wedlock, Christian Theodor von Pincier (1750–1824), the adopted son of Baron von Pincier of Sweden.

Ancestry

References

 At the House of Welf site

External links
 

1713 births
1780 deaths
Princes of Wolfenbüttel
Nobility from Braunschweig
House of Brunswick-Bevern
Protestant monarchs
Generals of the Holy Roman Empire
Military personnel from Braunschweig
Burials at Brunswick Cathedral